Lionel de La Laurencie (24 July 1861 – 21 November 1933) was a French musicologist and first president of the 1917 founded Société française de musicologie (French association of musicologists) from 1917 to 1920 and from 1931 to 1933.

Biography 
Graduated major of the French National School of Forestry, de La Laurencie devoted himself to music from 1898.

He studied at the University of Grenoble then in Nancy. A skilful violinist, he deepened his musical knowledge with Léon Reynier, master of violin, and enrolled at the Conservatoire de Paris where he was a student of Bourgault-Ducoudray in the classes of harmony and history of music of the latter.

He taught history of music at the école des hautes études en sciences sociales and wrote for the most notable French musical magazines.

He led the journal Société française de musicologie and participated to the Encyclopédie de musique et dictionnaire du Conservatoire under the direction of Albert Lavignac.

de La Laurencie was 's grandfather on the maternal side.

Selected publications 
1888: La légende de Parsifal et le drame musical de Richard Wagner.
1890: España,Read on Gallica
1906: L'Académie de musique et le concert de Nantes.
1908: Rameau.
1911: Lully.
1912: Deux imitateurs des bouffons.
1920: Les Créateurs de l'opéra français.
1934: Orphée de Gluck.

References

External links 
 Extended biography
 Lionel de La Laurencie on Encyclopédie Larousse
 Lionel de La Laurencie's Rameau
 Inventaire critique du fonds Blancheton de la bibliothèque du Conservatoire de Paris by Lionel de La Laurencie on Symétrie
  Lionel de la Laurencie. — L'Académie de Musique et le Concert de Nantes à l'Hôtel de la Bourse (1727-1767) on Persée

1861 births
Writers from Nantes
1933 deaths
19th-century French musicologists
20th-century French musicologists
Presidents of the Société française de musicologie